A slide rule is a mechanical analog computer.

Slide Rule may also refer to:
 Slide Rule (album), a 1992 album by Jerry Douglas
 Slide Rule (horse), thoroughbred racehorse
 Slide Rule: Autobiography of an Engineer, a partial autobiography of the British novelist Nevil Shute